Nicolas van de Walle is an American  political scientist specializing in comparative politics. He has taught at Cornell University since 2004, and is currently the Maxwell M. Upson Professor of Government. Between January 2004 and June 2008 he directed the Mario Einaudi Center for International Studies. Before coming to Cornell he taught at Michigan State University, and has worked at The World Bank and The United Nations Development Program. Since 2005, Van de Walle has served as the Associate Dean for International Studies. Van de Walle has written the "Africa" book review section for Foreign Affairs since the May/June 2004 issue.

Awards 
In 2002, Van de Walle was awarded the G.M. Luebbert Prize of the American Political Science Association for the best book in comparative politics for his book African Economies and the Politics of Permanent Crisis, 1979-1999 (Cambridge University Press, 2001).

Education 
 Ph.D., Princeton University, The Woodrow Wilson School of International and Public Affairs 1990
 M.S. in Economics (International Relations), London School of Economics and Political Science 1980
 B.A. in International Relations, University of Pennsylvania 1979

References 

Year of birth missing (living people)
Living people
Princeton University alumni
Cornell University faculty
Michigan State University faculty
American political scientists